Ignacio Fernández may refer to:

 Carlos Ignacio Fernández Lobbe (born 1974), Argentine rugby union player
 Ignacio Allende Fernández aka Torbe (born 1969), Spanish porn actor, director, and businessman
 Ignacio Fernández (born 1990), Argentine footballer
 Ignacio Fernández Esperón (1894–1968), Mexican composer
 Ignacio Fernández Rodríguez (born 1980), Spanish former footballer
 Ignacio Fernández Rouyet (born 1978), Argentina-born Italian rugby union player
 Ignacio Fernández Sánchez (1922–2012), Spanish actor, director, and comedian
 Ignacio Fernández Toxo (born 1952), Spanish activist, currently General Secretary of the Workers' Commissions Union (CCOO)
 José Ignacio "Nacho" Fernández (born 1990), Spanish international footballer
 José Ignacio Fernández Palacios (born 1967), Spanish former footballer